Guldpucken (The Golden Puck) is awarded annually to the ice hockey player of the year in Sweden.  It is similar to the NHL's Hart Memorial Trophy.  Normally it goes to a player in the Swedish Hockey League (SHL), the top-level ice hockey league in Sweden.  It should not be confused with Guldhjälmen (The Golden Helmet), the award for the most valuable player according to the players in the SHL.

This award has been won twice by five players: Anders Andersson, Leif Holmqvist, Peter Forsberg, Erik Karlsson and Victor Hedman. No player has won it three times. The sculpture Guldpucken is made by the Swedish artist Rune Hannäs.

Winners

Sources
 A to Z of Ice Hockey 
 Guldpucken winners on Expressen.se
 Guldpucken winners on Elite Prospects

Awards established in 1956
Swedish ice hockey trophies and awards
Swedish Hockey League
1956 establishments in Sweden